Ruth Leuwerik (23 April 1924 – 12 January 2016) was a German film actress, one of the most popular stars of German film during the 1950s. She appeared in 34 films between 1950 and 1977. Leuwerik is probably best known for her portrayal of Maria von Trapp in the films The Trapp Family and The Trapp Family in America.

Born in Essen as Ruth Leeuwerik, she grew up there and in Münster. She began her acting career with stage roles in the late 1940s. In the 1950s she and Dieter Borsche were considered as the ideal couple of the German film. In 1962 she starred in the Helmut Käutner film Redhead, which was entered in the 12th Berlin International Film Festival. She is a five-time Bambi Award winner. Leuwerik died in Munich on 12 January 2016.

Partial filmography

  (1950) – Evelyne Winterthur (her film debut)
 Father Needs a Wife (1952) – Susanne Meissner
 The Great Temptation (1952) – Hilde
 A Heart Plays False (1953) – Sybilla Zander
 Must We Get Divorced? (1953) – Garda von Doerr
 Beloved Life (1953) – Louise von Bolin
 His Royal Highness (1953, after Thomas Mann's novel) – Imma Spoelman
 Portrait of an Unknown Woman (1954) – Nicole
 Ludwig II (1955) – Kaiserin Elisabeth von Österreich
 Beloved Enemy (1955) – Violante Gore
 Roses in Autumn (1955, after Theodor Fontane's novel Effi Briest) – Effi Briest
 The Golden Bridge (1956) – Tima
 The Trapp Family (1956) – Baronin Maria von Trapp
 Queen Louise (1957) – Königin Luise
 Goodbye, Franziska (1957) – Franziska
 Immer wenn der Tag beginnt (1957) – Dr. Hanna Burkhardt
 Taiga (1958) – Hanna Dietrich
 The Trapp Family in America (1958) – Baronin Maria von Trapp
 Dorothea Angermann (1959) – Dorothea Angermann
 The Ideal Woman (1959) – Fanny Becker
 Sweetheart of the Gods (1960) – Renate Mueller
 A Woman for Life (1960) – Margarete Barnebusch
 You Don't Shoot at Angels (1960) – Maria
 Die Stunde, die du glücklich bist (1961) – Vera
 Der Traum von Lieschen Müller (1961) – Autograph hunter
 Redhead (1962) – Franziska Lukas
 Eleven Years and One Day (1963) – Tina Rodenbach
 The House in Montevideo (1963) – Marianne Nägler
 An Alibi for Death (1963) – Dr. Maria Rohn
 Und Jimmy ging zum Regenbogen (1971) – Valerie Steinfeld
  (1977) – Frau Gerda Cornelius
 Derrick (1978, Episode: "Ein Hinterhalt") – Dr. Marta Schwenn
 The Buddenbrooks (1979, TV miniseries, after Thomas Mann's novel) – Konsulin
 Derrick (1983, Episode: "") – Vera Baruda

References

External links

1924 births
2016 deaths
Actors from Essen
Best Actress German Film Award winners
German film actresses
German stage actresses
People from the Rhine Province
20th-century German actresses